Tim Tibesar (born August 27, 1972) is an American football coach who is the defensive coordinator and linebackers coach at Akron. Formerly was the defensive coordinator and outside linebackers coach at Oregon State University.

Coaching career 
Tibesar began his coaching career at San Diego State in 1997 as a student assistant and was later an assistant coach at Grossmont College in 1998, where he coached linebackers. After a stint as a graduate assistant at California and as the tight ends coach at Cornell, Tibesar returned to his alma mater North Dakota as linebackers coach, eventually being promoted to defensive coordinator in 2004. He left North Dakota to be the special teams coordinator at Kansas State in 2006. Tibesar was promoted to defensive coordinator in 2007 and was not retained when Kansas State head coach Ron Prince was fired and replaced with Bill Snyder. Tibesar's departure was highlighted when he filed a lawsuit against the university for additional compensation after he wasn't retained, leading to the university to discover an alleged secret deal between Prince and then-athletic director Bob Krause.

Tibesar was named the linebackers coach for the Montreal Alouettes of the Canadian Football League (CFL) in 2009, where he won two Grey Cups as an assistant coach. After one season as the Alouettes' defensive coordinator, Tibesar returned to the collegiate ranks as the defensive coordinator at Purdue. Tibesar spent only one season at Purdue before leaving to coach the linebackers for the Chicago Bears under former Alouettes head coach Marc Trestman. He was fired by the Bears after the season, ending his short tenure with the organization. After working as a defensive consultant for Northwestern in 2014, Tibesar was named the outside linebackers coach at Wisconsin in 2015.

Tibesar was named the defensive coordinator and outside linebackers coach at Oregon State in December 2017. He was terminated by Oregon State on November 7, 2021, the day after a 37-34 loss to Colorado.

In 2022, Tibesar joined Joe Moorhead's staff at Akron as the defensive coordinator.

References

External links 
 
 Oregon State Beavers profile
 National Football Foundation profile

1972 births
Living people
Sportspeople from Saint Paul, Minnesota
Players of American football from Saint Paul, Minnesota
Coaches of American football from Minnesota
American football linebackers
North Dakota Fighting Hawks football players
San Diego State Aztecs football coaches
California Golden Bears football coaches
Cornell Big Red football coaches
North Dakota Fighting Hawks football coaches
Kansas State Wildcats football coaches
Montreal Alouettes coaches
Purdue Boilermakers football coaches
Chicago Bears coaches
Northwestern Wildcats football coaches
Wisconsin Badgers football coaches
Oregon State Beavers football coaches